Saint Michael's Abbey may refer to:

St. Michael's Abbey, Antwerp
St Michael's Abbey, Farnborough, England
St. Michael's Abbey, Metten, Germany
St. Michael's Abbey (Orange County, California), USA
Abbey of St. Michael's, Munkalif, Norway
Sacra di San Michele, Susa Valley, Italy